Kim Young-ok, a Korean name consisting of the family name Kim and the given name Young-ok, may refer to:

 Young-Oak Kim (1919–2005), Korean American men soldier
 Kim Young-ok (actress) (born 1937), South Korean actress
 Kim Soo-mi (born Kim Young-ok; 1949), South Korean actress
 Young Kim (born Kim Young-ok; 1962), Korean American women politician
 Kim Young-ok (speed skater) (born 1966), South Korean women speed skater
 Kim Yeong-ok (born 1974), South Korean women basketball player
 Kim Yong-ok (weightlifter) (born 1976), North Korean women weightlifter

See also
 Kim Yong-ok (disambiguation) (김용옥)